JA, Ja, jA,  or ja may refer to:

Arts and entertainment
Ja (novel), original German title of the novel Yes, by Thomas Bernhard
JA (TV series), a Danish television show

Businesses and organizations
Jamiat Ahle Hadith a political party in Pakistan
Japan Agricultural Cooperatives, in Japan 
Junior Achievement, a non-profit youth organization founded in 1919
B&H Airlines (IATA airline designator JA), a Bosnian airline
Yugoslav Action  (Serbo-Croatian: Jugoslovenska akcija), a Yugoslav nationalist organization active between 1930 and 1935

Linguistics
Ja, grammatical particle meaning "yes" in most Germanic languages (including informal English)
Ja, meaning "I" in many Slavic languages
Я (Ya), a Cyrillic letter, pronounced /ja/ in some languages
Japanese language (ISO 639-1 alpha-2 code JA)
Ja (Indic), a glyph in the Brahmic family of scripts
Ja (Javanese) (ꦗ), a letter in the Javanese script

People
 Ja (footballer) (born 1987), Cape Verdean footballer
 Ja Morant (born 1999), American basketball player
 Ja Rule (born 1976), American rapper, singer, songwriter, and actor

Science and technology
Ja (beetle), a genus of beetles in the family Carabidae
Chrysler JA platform, a series of vehicles made by Chrysler
Jasmonic acid, a plant hormone
British Rail Class 73/0 electro-diesel locomotives (Pre-TOPS classification JA)
NZR JA Class, a 4-8-2 steam locomotive used by New Zealand Railways

Other uses
Ja (unit), a unit of measurement of length in Korea
Japan (NATO country code)
Judge Advocate
Judge of Appeal

See also 
YA (disambiguation)